Kaveri (Tamil: காவேரி) is a South Indian former actress who predominantly worked in Tamil TV series and appeared in movies.

Personal life
Her birth name is Angela. She's an Anglo Indian by birth.

Kaveri made her debut as a heroine in the Tamil movie Vaigasi Poranthachu in 1990 and later began to focus on serials. She acted in Vamsam serial and left her career because her mother was admitted in hospital and died due to cancer. Due to depression she lost weight, and is currently a housewife. In 2013, Kaveri married businessman Rakesh at Rishivandiyam Arthanareeswarar Temple, Viluppuram district. Her husband conducts a pharmaceutical agency in Velachery, Chennai.

Film career
Kaveri made her debut in the Tamil movie Vaigasi Poranthachu, which was released in 1990. She is most well known for her role as Dhanam as the elder daughter of Chidambaram  in the TV series Metti Oli and Thangam for her role as Illavanji

Filmography

TV series
 1995 Sneha (E TV) as Sneha - Telugu
 1996Antha Oru Nimisham (Dordarshan TV) - Tamil
 1996-1997 Antharangalu (E TV) - Telugu
 1999-2000 Panchavarnakili  (Sun TV) as Durga - Tamil
 2000 Micro Thodar- Thuru Pudikkum Manasu (Raj TV) as Valli- Tamil
 2000-2001 Anandha Bhavan (Sun TV as Keerthana - Tamil
 2002-2005 Metti Oli (Sun TV) as Dhanam - Tamil
 2002-2006 Rudhraveenai (Sun TV) as Dasi Maali - Tamil 
 2006 Malargal (Sun TV) as Padmini 
 2006-2007 Surya (Sun TV) as Lakshmikandham - Tamil
 2008Kasthuri (Sun TV) - Tamil
 2009 Arasi (Sun TV) as Ranjini - Tamil
 2009-2013 Thangam (Sun TV) as Ilavanji - Tamil
 2010Meera (Star Vijay) as Shantha - Tamil
 2010-2011 Kodi Mullai (Raj TV) - Tamil
 2010-2012 Vilakku Vacha Nerathula (Kalaignar TV) - Tamil
 2013-2014 Vamsam (Sun TV) as Chinnaponnu - Tamil
 2014 Gayathri (Zee TV) - Tamil

References

External links

Actresses in Tamil cinema
Living people
Actresses in Telugu cinema
Indian film actresses
Tamil actresses
Actresses in Tamil television
20th-century Indian actresses
21st-century Indian actresses
Female models from Tamil Nadu
Year of birth missing (living people)